Arthrostylidium excelsum is a species of Arthrostylidium bamboo in the grass family.

Synonym 
The synonym is Arundinaria excelsa.

Distribution 
Arthrostylidium excelsum is commonly found in Mexico, Central America, and the West Indies.

Description
Arthrostylidium excelsum has a 2–3 mm diameter and can grow up to 100–500 cm long.

References

excelsum
Flora of Mexico